The Porsuk River also Kocasu-Porsuk River, ancient Tembris, is a river in Turkey, that flows for . The city of Eskişehir is sited on the banks of this river. The river is dammed by the Porsuk dam forming large reservoirs. The Porsuk flows into the Sakarya River near the town of Polatlı, ancient Gordium.

See also

 List of rivers of Turkey

References

Rivers of Turkey
Landforms of Eskişehir Province